Robert William Bale (born 19 July 1990) is an English swimmer who represented Great Britain at the 2012 Summer Olympics.

Bale was born in Manchester, and raised in Lancaster, Lancashire.  He attended Ripley St Thomas School and first swam with the Carnforth and District Swimming Club (Carnforth Otters).

He made his first world championship team for the 2009 FINA World Championships in Rome, competing in the 4x200-metre freestyle relay final as Great Britain finished seventh.  At the 2012 Summer Olympics in London, he was a member of the British men's team that finished sixth in the 4×200-metre freestyle relay.

References

1990 births
Living people
English male freestyle swimmers
Olympic swimmers of Great Britain
Swimmers at the 2012 Summer Olympics
Sportspeople from Manchester